Woodford's fruit bat (Melonycteris woodfordi), also known as the orange fruit bat, is a species of megabat in the family Pteropodidae. It is endemic to the Solomon Islands.

References

Melonycteris
Bats of Oceania
Endemic fauna of the Solomon Islands
Mammals of the Solomon Islands
Mammals of Papua New Guinea
Taxonomy articles created by Polbot
Mammals described in 1887
Taxa named by Oldfield Thomas